Čadovlje pri Tržiču is a settlement in the Municipality of Tržič in the Upper Carniola region of Slovenia.

Name
The name of the settlement was changed from Čadovlje to Čadovlje pri Tržiču in 1953.

References

External links 

Čadovlje pri Tržiču at Geopedia

Populated places in the Municipality of Tržič